Bobovek ( or ) is a small settlement in the Municipality of Kranj in the Upper Carniola region of Slovenia.

Geography

West of the settlement, two former clay pits have formed small lakes with a unique biotope, which is now a protected nature reserve. Mammoth remains, as well as fossilized remains of shoals of common dace, have been discovered in the clay layers.

Name
Bobovek was attested in written sources as Wobovik in 1399 and Bobwnig in 1417, among other spellings.

Gallery

References

External links

Bobovek on Geopedia

Populated places in the City Municipality of Kranj